Pak Song-chol (1913–2008) is the former Premier of North Korea.

Pak Song-chol may also refer to:
 Pak Song-chol (athlete) (born 1984), North Korea long-distance runner
 Pak Song-chol (footballer, born 1987), North Korea midfielder, currently playing for Rimyongsu
 Pak Song-chol (footballer, born 1991), North Korea forward, currently playing for April 25